Taylour Dominique Paige-Angulo (born October 5, 1990) is an American actress and dancer. She is best known for her role as Ahsha Hayes in the VH1 sports drama series Hit the Floor, and has gained recognition for her performances in the films Jean of the Joneses (2016), White Boy Rick (2018), Ma Rainey's Black Bottom (2020), Boogie (2021), and Zola (2020). Her performance in the latter film won her the Independent Spirit Award for Best Female Lead.

In 2022, Paige ventured into music, collaborating with Kendrick Lamar on the song "We Cry Together", which reached the top twenty on the Billboard Hot 100 and earned her a Grammy Award nomination.

Early life and education
Taylour Dominique Paige was born on October 5, 1990, in Santa Monica, California to Reginald Paige and Cheryl Williams. She grew up in Inglewood, California, a suburb of Los Angeles, with her older brother Travis. Paige began dancing at the age of 2 and trained at Katnap in Venice, Westside Ballet Academy, and later spent two consecutive summers at the Kirov Academy of Ballet in Washington, DC. In 2001, she became a student of choreographer Debbie Allen, and auditioned for her musical Pearl.

Paige attended St. Bernard Catholic High School in Playa del Rey where she graduated in 2008. She became a Los Angeles Laker Girl in 2010 and spent three months with the professional cheerleading squad before leaving to finish college and pursue her acting career. As a Laker Girl, she was featured in a special by Fox Sports on the making of the 2011 Laker Girls Calendar. She is a graduate of Loyola Marymount University.

Career
Paige has been featured in commercials and advertising campaigns for Transamerica, Best Buy, McDonald's, Adidas and Just Dance 3 following her stint as a Laker Girl. Her first film role was in High School Musical 3: Senior Year (2008), where she was a featured dancer. After appearing in small roles in several short films, Paige starred as Ahsha Hayes in the sports drama television series Hit the Floor (2013–2018). She left the show in 2016 after three seasons.

In 2016, Paige starred as the eponymous character in Canadian filmmaker Stella Meghie's directorial debut Jean of the Joneses. The film was met with positive reviews. She had a supporting role as Cathy Volsan-Curry in the crime drama film White Boy Rick (2018), which was met with mixed reviews. Paige has made guest appearances in the thirteenth season of Grey's Anatomy and Ballers.

Paige had her breakthrough role as the titular character in the black comedy crime film Zola (2020). The film and her performance earned rave reviews, and earned Paige the Independent Spirit Award for Best Female Lead. That same year, Paige had a supporting role as Dussie Mae in the drama film Ma Rainey's Black Bottom, which was met with critical acclaim and earned her an NAACP Image Award nomination for Outstanding Supporting Actress in a Motion Picture. In May 2022, Paige made her music debut by contributing to rapper Kendrick Lamar's fifth studio album Mr. Morale & the Big Steppers on the critically-acclaimed track "We Cry Together", earning a Grammy Award nomination. She then co-starred alongside Lamar on its short film adaptation in September. In November, Paige was featured in Barbadian singer Rihanna's fourth installment of her Savage X Fenty Show.

Upcoming projects 
In May 2021, Paige landed the female lead opposite Peter Dinklage and Jacob Tremblay in the upcoming superhero film The Toxic Avenger for Legendary Entertainment. On August 23, Deadline Hollywood reported that she closed another deal with Legendary to star in the upcoming comedy film Brothers. In March 2022, Paige signed on to star alongside Vito Schnabel in the upcoming dark comedy film The Trainer. In September, she joined the cast of the upcoming action comedy film Beverly Hills Cop: Axel Foley, where she will star alongside Eddie Murphy and Joseph Gordon-Levitt.

Personal life 
From May 2019 to August 2021, Paige was in a relationship with actor Jesse Williams. On October 5, 2022, she married fashion designer Gary "Rivington Starchild" Angulo after sharing their engagement two weeks prior.

Filmography

Film

Television

Music videos

Discography

Charted songs

Awards and nominations

References

External links

1990 births
21st-century African-American people
21st-century African-American women
21st-century American actresses
Actresses from Inglewood, California
Actresses from Los Angeles
Actresses from Santa Monica, California
African-American actresses
African-American female dancers
African-American dancers
American cheerleaders
American female dancers
21st-century American dancers
African-American female models
American female models
African-American models
American television actresses
Independent Spirit Award for Best Female Lead winners
Living people
Loyola Marymount University alumni
National Basketball Association cheerleaders